The 181st Infantry Division (German: 181. Infanterie-Division) was a German division in World War II. It was formed on  1 December 1939.

Orders of Battle

181. Infanterie-Division 1940

Infanterie-Regiment 334
Infanterie-Regiment 349
Infanterie-Regiment 359
Artillerie-Regiment 222
Pionier-Battalion 222
Panzerjäger-Abteilung 222
Infanterie-Divisions-Nachrichten-Abteilung 222
Infanterie-Divisions-Nachschubführer 222

181. Infanterie-Division 1943

Grenadier-Regiment 359
Grenadier-Regiment 363
Divisions-Füsilier-Battalion 181
Artillerie-Regiment 222
Pionier-Battalion 222
Panzerjäger-Abteilung 222
Infanterie-Divisions-Nachrichten-Abteilung 222
Infanterie-Divisions-Nachschubführer 222

Commanding officers

Generalleutnant Peter Bielfeld, 1 December 1939 – 10 January 1940
Generalleutnant Kurt Woytasch, 10 January 1940 – 1 March 1942
Generalleutnant Friedrich Bayer, 1 March 1942 – 24 March 1942
Generalleutnant Hermann Fischer, 24 March 1942 – 1 October 1944
Generalleutnant Eugen Bleyer, 1 October 1944 – 8 May 1945

External links

Infantry divisions of Germany during World War II
Military units and formations established in 1939
1939 establishments in Germany
Military units and formations disestablished in 1945
Military units and formations of Germany in Yugoslavia in World War II